The National Reconciliation Party is a political party in The Gambia. It was founded in 1996, and is led by its founder, Hamat Bah.

History 
The National Reconciliation Party was founded in 1996 by Hamat Bah as part of his intention to run for the presidency. He finished third in the 1996 presidential election. 2 NRP NAMs were elected in the 1997 parliamentary election. In the 2001 presidential election, Bah came third. The NRP was part of the Coalition 2016 for the 2016 presidential election, where Adama Barrow was declared the coalition's candidate and subsequently won.

Notable members 

 Hamat Bah, Leader of the NRP (1996–present), NAM (1997–2005), Minister of Tourism and Culture (2017–present)
 Modou Bamba Gaye, NAM (2015–2017)
 Samba Jallow, NAM (2012–present), National Assembly Minority Leader (2012–present)

Electoral history

Presidential elections

National Assembly elections

References 

Political parties in the Gambia
Main